A triselenide is a compound or ion which contains three selenium atoms or ions. Some examples include:
 Arsenic triselenide - Ar2Se3
 Niobium triselenide - NbSe3
 Antimony triselenide - Sb2Se3
 Gallium(III) selenide - Ga2Se3

Selenides